(born 29 May 1978 in Aichi, Japan) is a Japanese rugby union player. Yamamoto has played 26 matches for the Japan national rugby union team.
Yamamoto was a member of the Japan squad at the 2003 and 2007 Rugby World Cups.

References

Living people
1978 births
Japanese rugby union players
Asian Games medalists in rugby union
Rugby union players at the 2002 Asian Games
Toyota Verblitz players
Japan international rugby union players
Asian Games silver medalists for Japan
Medalists at the 2002 Asian Games
Rugby union props